Jerónimo Manrique de Lara or Jerónimo Manrique Figueroa (1530–1593) was a Roman Catholic prelate who served as Bishop of Salamanca (1579–1593).

Biography
Jerónimo Manrique de Lara was born in Córdoba, Andalusia, Spain in 1530, the son of Manrique de Aguayo and Juana de Figueroa. 
On 9 Jan 1579, he was appointed during the papacy of Pope Gregory XIII as Bishop of Salamanca.
On 29 Mar 1579, he was consecrated bishop by Martín de Córdoba Mendoza, Bishop of Córdoba, with Francisco Pacheco de Córdoba, Bishop of Málaga, and Diego de Simancas, Bishop of Zamora, serving as co-consecrators. 
He served as Bishop of Salamanca until his death on 19 Sep 1593.
While bishop, he was the principal consecrator of Pedro Vélez Guevara, Bishop of Ciudad Rodrigo (1584); and Pedro Castro Quiñones, Archbishop of Granada (1590).

References 

16th-century Roman Catholic bishops in Spain
Bishops appointed by Pope Gregory XIII
1530 births
1593 deaths